Grand Gala is a 1952 French drama film directed by François Campaux and starring Ludmilla Tchérina, Odile Versois and Yves Vincent.

The film's sets were designed by the art directors Raymond Gabutti and Robert Gys.

Cast
 Ludmilla Tchérina as Monique 
 Odile Versois as Anna 
 Yves Vincent as Pierre Bouvais 
 Pierre Larquey as M. Punch, le clown 
 André Gabriello as Michel 
 Yvonne Alexander as Une danseuse 
 Monique Aïssata as Zizi 
 Olga Baïdar-Poliakoff as Poupoul 
 Thomy Bourdelle as Robert 
 Raoul Celada as Un danseur 
 Annie Chartrette as Nadia 
 Richard Flagey
 Anne-Marie Mersen
 Michel Rayne as Un danseur

References

Bibliography 
 Philippe Rège. Encyclopedia of French Film Directors, Volume 1. Scarecrow Press, 2009.

External links 
 

1952 films
1952 drama films
French drama films
1950s French-language films
Films directed by François Campaux
French black-and-white films
1950s French films